Noddy Bay is a local service district in the Canadian province of Newfoundland and Labrador. It is on the Great Northern Peninsula of the island of Newfoundland. It has a population of 60 people.

Geography 
Noddy Bay is in Newfoundland within Subdivision P of Division No. 8.

Government 
Noddy Bay is a local service district (LSD) that is governed by a committee responsible for the provision of certain services to the community. The chair of the LSD committee is Carl Hedderson.

See also 
List of local service districts in Newfoundland and Labrador

References 

Local service districts in Newfoundland and Labrador